Ling Wan Ting (Jyutping: ling4 jyun2 ting4; born 24 November 1980) is a badminton player from Hong Kong.

She played badminton at the 2004 Summer Olympics, losing to Cheng Shao-chieh of Chinese Taipei in the round of 32.

References

 Ling Wan Ting at Sports Reference

Hong Kong female badminton players
Olympic badminton players of Hong Kong
Badminton players at the 2004 Summer Olympics
Asian Games medalists in badminton
1980 births
Living people
Badminton players at the 2002 Asian Games
Badminton players at the 1998 Asian Games
Badminton players at the 2000 Summer Olympics
Asian Games bronze medalists for Hong Kong
Medalists at the 2002 Asian Games
21st-century Hong Kong women